Antoinette Renee Frank (born April 30, 1971) is a former officer of the New Orleans Police Department (NOPD) who, on March 4, 1995, committed a violent armed robbery at a restaurant which resulted in the killing of two members of the Vietnamese-American family who ran the establishment, and fellow NOPD officer Ronald A. Williams II. She was aided by her probable lover, drug dealer Rogers Lacaze. Frank currently resides at the Louisiana Correctional Institute for Women in St. Gabriel, Louisiana, the only woman on the state's death row.

Police career
Antoinette Frank applied to the New Orleans Police Department (NOPD) in early 1993. According to author Chuck Hustmyre, Frank was caught lying on several sections of her employment application and failed two standard psychiatric evaluations, with psychiatrist Philip Scurria advising against her hiring. Despite this, Frank got a second chance to apply. The NOPD was chronically short-handed; at the time, its officers were paid less than in similarly sized cities, it was losing officers faster than they could be replaced, and the ranks had been decimated by several arrests for murder and drug activity. Many potential applicants were shut out due to a requirement that all officers be residents of New Orleans – a requirement that was only changed in 2014. NOPD officials also thought having more African-Americans like Frank on the force would ease longstanding racial tensions in the majority-black city. She was hired on February 7, 1993, and graduated from the police academy on February 28.

Although Frank graduated near the top of her academy class, her tenure with the NOPD was mostly undistinguished. Her fellow officers thought she was rather shy, had no idea what police work really entailed, and lacked the decisiveness to be a good officer. At times, they thought Frank veered into irrational behavior. As early as August 1993, Frank's superiors wanted to send her back to the academy for further training. She frequently had to go through supervisory review. On occasion, though, she did distinguish herself, winning "Officer of the Month" awards from the local Kiwanis Club for her work in the community.

Relationship with Rogers Lacaze
On November 25, 1994, Frank handled an incident in which Rogers Lacaze, a known drug dealer, had been shot. An investigator with the Department of Public Safety and Corrections (DOC) believed this was the first contact between the two, although in her statement, Frank claims that they met some eight months before the murders. Frank had taken a statement from Lacaze after he was shot on the street, and initially got closer to him in hopes of turning his life around. However, she was smitten by Lacaze's "bad boy" persona, and their relationship soon turned sexual. She kept up her relationship even though she was well aware she was jeopardizing her career.

The association between Frank and Lacaze became noticeable after other police officers witnessed Lacaze driving her car, and even observed him moving her police unit at the scene of an accident she was investigating. On one occasion, Lacaze accompanied her on a complaint call where she introduced him as a "trainee"; on other occasions, she introduced Lacaze as her nephew. Prior to the murders, others testified that Frank and Lacaze would pull over and rob motorists while in a squad car.

Frank refused to discuss her relationship with Lacaze during the DOC investigation, except to say that she was trying to help him. It was later revealed that the two had a sexual relationship. When asked why she would continue the relationship, knowing that Lacaze had been involved in dealing drugs and a shooting, she responded that she would not disassociate herself from him just because of his past. The investigator also questioned Frank about trying to buy 9mm ammunition for Lacaze at Walmart on the day before the Kim Anh murders, but stated that she was a police officer and that there was nothing wrong with her buying ammunition. In her statement, she claimed that she and Lacaze were not dating and had never been intimate. Frank refused to discuss anything regarding the murders - every time the investigator asked her a question, she told him to "look it up in the record" or asserted her innocence. However, during her interview with the DOC investigator, Frank claimed to have had a male suitor but refused to go into specifics because he worked for the police department.

Two men who claimed they met Lacaze at a party on February 4, 1995, John Stevens and Anthony Wallace, testified in court. As the two were leaving the party, a verbal altercation between Stevens and Lacaze ensued, but Wallace suggested they leave. The two men got in a car and drove several blocks until a police vehicle pulled the car over. In police uniform, Frank exited the squad car and told Wallace and Stevens to get out and go to the back of the car. At that point, Wallace saw Lacaze and noticed he was holding a gun. According to Stevens, Wallace rushed Lacaze, and the two men began fighting. Then both Stevens and Frank also jumped into the fray, and the weapon discharged. Stevens began running, but another man appeared and grabbed both Lacaze and Wallace. Frank then told the man that "Lacaze was the good guy" and that Wallace was the one causing the problems. Wallace was restrained until a backup unit arrived on the scene when he was subsequently arrested and charged with attempted murder and armed robbery.

Irvin Bryant, a civil sheriff in 1995, testified that on the evening of February 4, he observed a stopped police vehicle with its lights flashing. Bryant thought the officer was making a traffic stop, but as he got closer, he saw the officer and two black men fighting on the side of the road. At that time, Wallace broke away, ran, and picked up a TEC-9 semi-automatic weapon off the grass. Bryant ordered Wallace to drop the gun, which he did immediately and was restrained; Lacaze then lunged toward Wallace, but Bryant grabbed him. Frank informed him that Lacaze was with her and ordered him released. Despite his involvement in the altercation, Bryant was never questioned by police, and he never gave a formal statement.

Restaurant robbery murders

After midnight on March 4, 1995, Frank and Lacaze visited Kim Anh, a Vietnamese restaurant run by the Vu family in New Orleans East. Frank had sometimes worked there off-duty as a security guard. As the employees cleaned the closed restaurant, Chau Vu went into the kitchen to count money and entered the dining room of the restaurant to pay Ronald A. Williams II. Williams was a colleague of Frank who had been working as the security guard that night to supplement his policeman's salary. He joined the New Orleans Police Department in 1991 and was a married father of two. When Chau went to pay Williams, Chau noticed Frank approaching the restaurant.

Frank and Lacaze had been at the restaurant twice earlier in the night to get leftover food to eat. When Chau had let her out on the last visit, she could not find the front door key, and with Frank returning for the third time, she sensed something was wrong. Chau ran to the kitchen to hide the money in the microwave. Frank entered the front door using the key she had stolen from the restaurant earlier and walked quickly past Williams, pushing Chau, Chau's brother Quoc, and a restaurant employee into the doorway of the restaurant's kitchen. Williams started to follow, hoping to find out what was happening when shots rang out. Lacaze had slipped behind Williams and shot him in the neck, severing his spinal cord and instantly paralyzing him. As Williams fell, Lacaze continued to shoot him in the head and back, mortally wounding him. As Frank turned back to the restaurant dining room, Chau grabbed Quoc to hide somewhere.

Chau, Quoc, and the employee hid in the rear of a large walk-in cooler in the kitchen, turning out its light as they entered. They did not know the whereabouts of their other sister and brother, Ha and Cuong Vu, who had been sweeping the dining room floors when Frank entered the restaurant. From inside the cooler, Chau and Quoc could partially see the restaurant's kitchen and front. Chau initially could see Frank looking for something in the kitchen. As Frank moved out of Chau's line of vision, additional gunshots were fired but then observed Frank searching where the Vus usually kept their money. Frank and Lacaze had been shouting at Ha and Cuong, demanding the restaurant's money, but they did not know where Chau had hidden it. Frank pistol-whipped 17-year-old Cuong when he hesitated in revealing the location of the money. Frank got the money out of a microwave, then shot 21-year-old Ha three times as she knelt, pleading for her life. Then, she shot Cuong six times. After Frank and Lacaze left the premises, Chau tried frantically to call 911 on her cell phone, but the cooler prevented her from getting a usable signal. Quoc emerged from the cooler and ran out the restaurant's back door to a nearby friend's home to call 911 to report the murders.

The robbers fled the restaurant, and Frank dropped Lacaze off at a nearby apartment complex, both knowing that witnesses were left behind. Frank heard the 911 call on her portable police radio saying that an officer was down at the Kim Anh restaurant. She borrowed a patrol car and returned to the scene. Posing as a responding officer, she intended to kill Chau and Quoc to ensure there would be no witnesses. Parking in the rear, Frank entered through the restaurant's back door and made her way through the kitchen to the dining room, where Chau waited for help at the front door. As Chau bolted through the restaurant's front door to the safety of arriving officers, Frank immediately identified herself as a police officer. Chau told Frank she knew what she had done and cried to the officers that Frank had committed the crimes.

Eddie Rantz, the homicide detective who worked the case, believed Frank and Lacaze planned the robbery to get revenge on Williams. Frank believed Williams was shortchanging her on hours and pay at the Kim Anh, and wanted revenge. Rantz subsequently described Frank as the most cold-hearted person he'd ever encountered in three decades as an officer.

Chau and Frank were questioned in detail while seated at different tables in the restaurant. Frank was arrested and charged with three counts of first degree murder. Lacaze was arrested and charged later that night. Frank was taken to police headquarters for additional questioning, where she later confessed to the crimes along with Lacaze. She was believed to be the first New Orleans police officer to have been charged with killing a fellow officer.

Trial and conviction
Frank and Lacaze were indicted by an Orleans Parish grand jury on April 28, 1995. Their trials were severed, and Lacaze was tried first on July 17–21, 1995, before Judge Frank Marullo. He was found guilty as charged and sentenced to death.  His main tip-off had been using Williams' Chevron credit card at a Chevron station in Gretna just minutes after the robbery and murders.

Frank's trial began on September 5, 1995, also before Marullo. Although Frank's attorneys had subpoenaed 39 witnesses, they didn't call a single one.
On September 12, 1995, the jury needed only 22 minutes to return a guilty verdict on all counts—at the time, a record for a capital murder case in New Orleans. The next day, they needed only 45 minutes to recommend the death penalty. She was formally sentenced to death on October 20, 1995, and sent to Death Row at the Louisiana Correctional Institute for Women (LCIW) in St. Gabriel, near Baton Rouge.

Aftermath and later developments
Officer Williams was interred in Lake Lawn Metairie Cemetery on March 7, 1995. His name was inscribed on the Memorial Wall at The National Law Enforcement Officers Memorial in Washington D.C.

Initially, the Vu family kept the restaurant open at the site of the tragedy in New Orleans East for a decade, until suffering flood damage from Hurricane Katrina in 2005, and post-storm looters stealing jewelry which Ha and Cuong had been wearing when they were killed. After that, Quoc Vu and his mother Nguyet sold the location, re-opening the restaurant in Harahan, and moving their residence to Metairie, where they said they felt safer.

In 1993, a year and a half before the murders at the Kim Anh, Frank's father had stayed at her home for a time before she then reported him missing. In November 1995, a month after she received her first death sentence, a dog led police to find a human skull with a bullet hole buried under Frank's house. In a 2005 retrospective, Chuck Hustmyre said, "As for those human bones unearthed beneath Frank’s house, so far, authorities have made no serious effort to identify them. The 10-year-old case, they say, remains under investigation."

Police and prosecutors believe that the skull was that of Adam Frank, and that Antoinette murdered him. However, since she is already on death row for the Kim Anh murders, they have made no effort to try her for her father's death.

On October 18, 2006, Frank's lawyers argued before the Louisiana Supreme Court that her death sentence should be overturned because she was denied state-funded experts to help prepare for the sentencing phase of the trial. They argued that the defense needed to conduct "an investigation into the defendant's background for possible mitigating evidence." Frank's attorneys introduced the testimony of psychiatrists who said that possible traumatic events in Frank's childhood could have affected her behavior at the time of the murders and she may have been suffering from post-traumatic stress disorder. A psychiatrist retained by the state disagreed that Frank showed symptoms of trauma; he agreed with the diagnosis of narcissistic personality disorder with antisocial tendencies given to Frank by doctors at the Louisiana Correctional Institute for Women. On May 22, 2007, the Louisiana Supreme Court ruled 5–2 that the death penalty should be upheld.

On April 22, 2008, District Judge Frank Marullo signed the death warrant for Antoinette Frank. According to the warrant, Frank was scheduled for execution by lethal injection on July 15, 2008. In May, however, the Louisiana Supreme Court issued a 90-day stay of execution effective June 10 pending ongoing appeals.

On September 11, 2008 the day that the state supreme court stay was to end, a new death warrant was signed by the same judge. According to this second warrant, Frank was scheduled for execution by lethal injection on December 8, 2008. In a new round of appeals, defense attorneys argued they had had too little time to review the voluminous record before the deadline for filing appeals. The state supreme court ruled on the case again. Their decision, made public November 25, 2008 effectively voided the death warrant signed by Judge Marullo in September.

In September 2009, Frank's lawyers moved to have Judge Marullo removed from her ongoing post-conviction appeals on grounds of bias, given that he had already signed two death warrants for her. Louisiana state Judge Laurie White heard the motion in September 2009 and, on January 3, 2010 ruled that Marullo should not be taken off the case. Frank's attorney stated she would appeal the ruling to the state's supreme court, which had already overruled both of Marullo's death warrants. However, yet another lower court state judge, ruled in October 2010 that Marullo had to be recused from the Frank and Lacaze cases because it was unclear if he had been open with the defense teams about his own surprising connection to the gun used in the restaurant murders.  Marullo's signature appeared on an order authorizing Frank to take the murder weapon from the evidence room; Marullo has long maintained the signature was forged. No female has been executed by the State of Louisiana since Toni Jo Henry died in the State's Electric chair in 1942.

On July 23, 2015, retired district judge Michael Kirby threw out Rogers Lacaze's conviction and sentence and ordered a new trial. Kirby said that Lacaze deserved a new trial because one of the jurors hid the fact that he was a Louisiana state trooper and previously worked as a railroad policeman. At the time, commissioned law enforcement officers were legally barred from sitting on a jury. Kirby wrote that while he felt the evidence of Lacaze's guilt was "overwhelming", the juror misconduct amounted to a "structural defect" and a "violation of a constitutional right so basic to a fair trial" that the only remedy was a new trial. Kirby's ruling has no effect on Frank's conviction. An appellate court later overturned the new trial order for Lacaze. 4th Circuit appellate judges Edwin Lombard, Paul Bonin and Madeleine Landrieu ruled "After review of the state's writ application in light of the applicable law and arguments of the parties, we find that the trial court erred in finding that the seating of Mr. Settle on the defendant's jury was a structural error entitling him to a new trial".

Frank was profiled in an episode of Deadly Women in 2009,  Snapped: Killer Couples in 2015, and I'd Kill For You in 2016.

In November of 2020, TV One debuted a movie inspired by Antoinette Frank called Blood On Her Badge .

LCIW was damaged by 2016 flooding, so its prisoners, including Frank, were moved to other prisons.

Lacaze was re-sentenced to life imprisonment without parole on December 13, 2019. Lacaze is serving his sentence at the Louisiana State Penitentiary ("Angola") in West Feliciana Parish.

See also

List of women on death row in the United States
Thomas A. Brown, Depression era police chief from St. Paul, Minnesota, who, according to FBI documents, ordered an August 30, 1933 armed robbery by the Barker-Karpis Gang which resulted in the murder of South St. Paul police officer Leo Pavlak and the maiming of police officer John Yeaman.
Len Davis - another New Orleans police officer on death row

Sources

General sources

References

Further reading
 Dittrich, Stacy, (2009), Murder Behind the Badge: True Stories of Cops Who Kill, Prometheus Books.
 Hustmyre, Chuck, (2008), Killer with a Badge: The Story of Antoinette Frank, The Copkilling Cop, Iuniverse Books.
 Reyes, Traciy Curry, (2020) Blood On Her Badge: The Real Dee & Trey in TV One True-Story Movie , TV Crime Sky.

1971 births
1995 murders in the United States
Living people
American police officers convicted of murder
New Orleans Police Department officers
American women police officers
American female murderers
American people convicted of murdering police officers
American prisoners sentenced to death
Prisoners sentenced to death by Louisiana
People convicted of murder by Louisiana
Police officers convicted of robbery
African-American police officers
American police officers
American people convicted of murder
People from Opelousas, Louisiana
People with narcissistic personality disorder
Women sentenced to death
20th-century American criminals
Crime in Louisiana
Criminals from Louisiana
20th-century African-American women
20th-century African-American people
21st-century African-American women
21st-century African-American people